The patellar plexus is a plexus of fine nerves situated in front of the patella, the ligamentum patellae and the upper end of the tibia. It is formed by contribution from the following:

1)The anterior division of lateral cutaneous nerve

2)The intermediate cutaneous nerve

3)The anterior division of the medial cutaneous nerve

4)The infrapatellar branch of saphenous nerve.

References 

Nerves of the lower limb and lower torso
Nerve plexus